Messaoud Layadi (born 24 March 1982) is an Algerian handball player for GS Pétroliers.

He competed for the Algerian national team at the 2015 World Men's Handball Championship in Qatar.

He also participated at the 2009 and 2011 World Championships.

References

1982 births
Living people
Algerian male handball players
21st-century Algerian people
Mediterranean Games competitors for Algeria
Competitors at the 2009 Mediterranean Games
20th-century Algerian people